Kasey Peters (born May 20, 1987) is an American football quarterback. He played college football at Saddleback, Santa Ana, Grand Valley State and Rocky Mountain. He was a member of the Tri-Cities Fever, New Mexico Stars, West Texas Wildcatters, Duke City Gladiators, Las Vegas Outlaws, New Orleans VooDoo, Portland Steel and Monterrey Steel.

Peters last played for Fundidores de Monterrey of the Liga de Fútbol Americano Profesional.

Early years
Peters played high school football at Newport Harbor High School in Newport Beach, California. He threw for 13 touchdowns and 2 interceptions junior year in 2003 before suffering a season-ending broken collarbone in the seventh game of the season. He was named to the Daily Pilots football dream team in 2003. He completed 156 of 274 passes for 2,140 yards and 23 touchdowns his senior year in 2004 while helping Newport Harbor advance to the California Interscholastic Federation (CIF) Southern Section Division VI championship game, where they lost to Orange Lutheran High School by a score of 35–6. In 2004, he earned All-CIF, Sea View League Offensive Player of the Year and First Team All-Sea View honors. He also played in the Orange County All-Star Game, was named to the Daily Pilots dream team and was named the Daily Pilots dream team player of the year in 2004. He threw for career totals of 3,700 yards, 39 touchdowns and nine interceptions at Newport Harbor High. He had a 17–3–1 record as a starter.

College career
Peters played college football for the Saddleback Gauchos of Saddleback College in 2005. He broke his right forearm in the first quarter of the fourth game and missed the rest of the season.

He transferred to play for the Santa Ana College Dons in 2006. Peters set single-season school records in completions with 203, passing attempts with 363, passing yards with 2,588 and passing touchdowns with 25. He threw eleven interceptions. He also earned J.C. Grid-Wire Honorable Mention All-American honors and Second Team Mission Football Conference National Division recognition. Peters led the Dons to a 7–4 record and a berth in the Western States Bowl.

In the class of 2007, he was rated a two-star recruit by Rivals.com and a three-star recruit by Scout.com. He was also rated the No. 18 junior college quarterback in the country by Scout.com. He redshirted for the Grand Valley State Lakers of Grand Valley State University in 2007.

He transferred to play for the Rocky Mountain Battlin' Bears of Rocky Mountain College in 2008. He completed 322 of 516 passes for 3,541 yards, 27 touchdowns and 13 interceptions while also rushing for 40 yards and 1 touchdown in 2008, earning Second Team All-Frontier honors. Peters led the Frontier Conference in total offense with 3,581 yards and total offense per game with 325.5 yards in 2008. He completed 383 of 588 passes for 4,160 yards, 31 touchdowns and 6 interceptions while also rushing for 278 yards and 2 touchdowns in 2009, earning First Team All-Frontier and CollegeFanz Sports Network NAIA Honorable Mention All-American honors. He shared Frontier Conference Co-Offensive Player of the Year honors with Eastern Oregon quarterback Chris Ware. Peters led the Frontier Conference with 4,438 yards of total offense and the NAIA with 403.5 yards of total offense per game in 2009. He was named the NAIA Offensive Player of the Week for Week 7 of the 2009 season after completing 40 of 47 passes for 471 yards and 6 touchdowns while also scoring a rushing touchdown in a 52–27 win against Montana State–Northern. Upon appeal, he was granted another year of eligibility but he would have to sit out the first three games of the 2010 season. He completed 177 of 274 passes for 2,330 yards, 22 touchdowns and 7 interceptions while also rushing for 390 yards and 3 touchdowns in 2010, earning First Team All-Frontier and Victory Sports Network NAIA Honorable Mention All-American honors. He shared Frontier Conference Co-Offensive Player of the Year honors with Carroll quarterback Gary Wagner. Peters set since-broken school records for career passing yards and yards of total offense with 10,031 and 10,739, respectively. He scored 86 total touchdowns at Rocky Mountain and was the third quarterback in Frontier Conference history to record 10,000 yards of total offense. He played in the Victory Sports Network Senior Classic in April 2011.

Professional career
Peters was rated the 63rd best quarterback in the 2011 NFL Draft by NFLDraftScout.com.

Tri-Cities Fever
Peters was signed by the Tri-Cities Fever of the Indoor Football League (IFL) in December 2011. He played in 5 games during the 2012 season, completing 8 of 11 passes for 31 yards and 1 touchdown as the backup to Houston Lillard. In 2013, he became the Fever's starter after Lillard's departure. Peters started the first five games of the 2013 season, completing 76 of 151 passes for 690 yards, 12 touchdowns and 8 interceptions. He also rushed for 43 yards and 1 touchdown. He accumulated a 1–4 record with the Fever and was released by the team on April 8, 2013, after three straight losses.

New Mexico Stars
Peters signed with the New Mexico Stars of the Lone Star Football League (LSFL) in April 2013. He threw for 1,973 yards, 49 touchdowns and three interceptions in seven games. He shared LSFL Co-Offensive MVP honors with Amarillo Venom quarterback Nate Davis. Peters earned LSFL Offensive Player of the Week honors for the final week of the regular season after completing 19 of 22 passes for 336 yards, an LSFL-record 12 touchdowns and 1 interception as the Stars beat the San Angelo Bandits by a score of 89–42. The Stars finished the season with a 6–6 record and earned a playoff berth. Peters completed 27 of 48 passes for 339 yards and 7 touchdowns in the Stars' playoff game, a 61–56 loss to the Laredo Rattlesnakes. He also threw an interception in the final minute of the game. In August 2013, it was reported that Peters had been invited to an invite-only tryout with the Iowa Barnstormers of the Arena Football League (AFL) in October 2013.

West Texas Wildcatters
In 2013, Peters signed with the West Texas Wildcatters of the LSFL for the 2014 season. He suffered a season-ending Achilles injury early in the season.

New Mexico Stars
Peters signed with the New Mexico Stars of Champions Indoor Football (CIF) for the 2015 season. However, the Stars shut down operations before the start of the season.

Duke City Gladiators
After the Stars shut down operations, Peters signed with the Duke City Gladiators of the CIF. He played in 8 games for the Gladiators during the 2015 season, completing 164 of 303 passes for 1,918 yards, 34 touchdowns and 8 interceptions. He also rushed for one touchdown. Peters led the CIF in passing yards per game with 239.8 and total offense per game with 238.2 yards. He was named the CIF Offensive Player of the Week for Week 12 after completing 31 of 45 passes for 390 yards and 8 touchdowns in an 89–86 overtime loss to the Amarillo Venom on May 16. He also scored a rushing touchdown against the Venom.

Las Vegas Outlaws
Peters was assigned to the Las Vegas Outlaws of the AFL on June 26, 2015. He relieved starter Dennis Havrilla on July 11, 2015, against the Arizona Rattlers, completing five of twelve passes for 41 yards with two interceptions. He was placed on recallable reassignment on July 14, 2015.

New Orleans VooDoo
Peters was assigned to the AFL's New Orleans VooDoo on July 28, 2015.

Portland Steel
Peters was assigned to the Portland Steel of the AFL on March 11, 2016. He relieved starter Danny Southwick in the fourth quarter of the team's Week 1 loss to the Arizona Rattlers, completing four of fifteen passes for 52 yards and a touchdown. He made his first career AFL start on April 30, 2016, completing 23 of 49 passes for 245 yards and three touchdowns with an interception in a 68–21 loss to the Rattlers. He was placed on reassignment by the Steel on May 12, 2016.

Duke City Gladiators
On May 26, 2016, Peters signed with the Duke City Gladiators. He played in one game for the Gladiators during the 2016 season, completing 21 of 28 passes for 302 yards, seven touchdowns and two interceptions.

Monterrey Steel
Peters signed with the Monterrey Steel of the National Arena League (NAL) on January 17, 2017. He played in 6 games for the Steel, completing 59 of 117 passes for 632 yards, 14 touchdowns, and 5 interceptions. He also scored a rushing touchdown. He was released by the Steel on June 3, 2017.

Fundidores de Monterrey
In February 2019, Peters was signed by Fundidores de Monterrey of the Liga de Fútbol Americano Profesional (LFA).

AFL statistics

Stats from ArenaFan:

Notes

References

External links
Just Sports Stats

Living people
1987 births
American football quarterbacks
Saddleback Gauchos football players
Santa Ana Dons football players
Grand Valley State Lakers football players
Rocky Mountain Battlin' Bears football players
Tri-Cities Fever players
New Mexico Stars players
West Texas Wildcatters players
Duke City Gladiators players
Las Vegas Outlaws (arena football) players
New Orleans VooDoo players
Portland Steel players
Monterrey Steel players
Fundidores de Monterrey players
Players of American football from California
Sportspeople from Newport Beach, California
Newport Harbor High School alumni
American expatriate players of American football
American expatriate sportspeople in Mexico